Mohamed Mohsen Leila (born January 24, 1995) is an Egyptian professional footballer who plays as a defensive midfielder for the Egyptian club El-Entag El-Harby. In 2015, Leila signed a 3-year contract for El-Entag moving from C.S. Marítimo B.

References

External links
Mohamed Mohsen Leila at KOOORA.com

Living people
1995 births
Egyptian footballers
Association football midfielders
Egyptian Premier League players
Campeonato de Portugal (league) players
Petrojet SC players
C.S. Marítimo players
El Entag El Harby SC players
Expatriate footballers in Portugal
Egyptian expatriates in Portugal